Brothers to Brutha is an American reality show on BET that was premiered on November 18, 2008. It follows five  brothers who have a record deal on Island Def Jam Music Group as the R&B group Brutha. It was shown on Tuesday nights at 10:30pm. The first season consisted of six episodes. A second season has been confirmed by Brutha on YouTube. The group released their first album, Brutha, on December 23, 2008.

The show received mixed reviews, with the Boston Herald saying "‘Brutha’ not a keeper" and the Detroit News saying that it "is a diamond-in-the-rough type of show that's full of potential".

Episodes
The series began on November 18, 2008, and concluded on December 23, 2008. 
 "Under One Roof" 
 "What Happened in Vegas?"
 "Sister of Mine"
 "A Brother's Love"
 "Just Like Rockstars!"
 "Brutha's Single"

Brothers 
Grady Harrell III - eldest brother
Anthony Harrell - second brother, lead singer 
Jared Overton - third brother
Cheyenne Harrell - fourth brother, lead singer
Jacob Harrell - youngest brother

References 

http://www.bet.com/shows/brothers-to-brutha.html/

http://www.detnews.com/apps/pbcs.dll/article?AID=/20081118/ENT10/811180394

http://www.bostonherald.com/entertainment/television/reviews/view.bg?articleid=1133074

https://web.archive.org/web/20110723205047/http://www.melodika.net/index.php?option=com_content&task=view&id=4658&Itemid=50

BET original programming